Wyoming Highway 343 (WYO 343) is a  north-south Wyoming State Road in northern Sheridan County that connects U.S. Route 14 (US 14) and WYO 345.

Route description
Wyoming Highway 343 begins its southern end at U.S. Route 14 at Dayton and from there travels northwest. At approximately 4 miles into the route, Highway 343 gently curves northeast as it meets Sheridan County Route 118 (Columbus Creek Road). Shortly thereafter, WYO 343 turns due north. Highway 343 ends after 5.24 miles at Wyoming Highway 345 (former US 87) southeast of Parkman.

Major intersections

See also

 List of state highways in Wyoming

References

External links

 Wyoming State Routes 300-399
 WYO 343 - US-14 to WYO 345
 Dayton, WY website

Transportation in Sheridan County, Wyoming
343